Cactus Springs is an unincorporated community in Clark County, Nevada located on U.S. Route 95, about  northwest of Las Vegas in the Mojave Desert. It is near Indian Springs and the Nevada Test Site. Cactus Springs is also the site of The Temple of Goddess Spirituality Dedicated to Sekhmet, the Egyptian goddess, built in 1993, "founded on the principles of Peace, Goddess Spirituality & the gift economy" by Genevieve Vaughan. The annual interfaith Sacred Peace Walk, conducted and organized by the Nevada Desert Experience, is supported, in part, by the temple on the peacewalk's way to the Nevada Test Site's southern gate.

References

External links
 Cactus Springs Community Profile
 Cactus Springs Birding
 The Temple of Goddess Spirituality Dedicated to Sekhmet 

1993 establishments in Nevada
Populated places established in 1993
Populated places in the Mojave Desert
Unincorporated communities in Clark County, Nevada